Misrata is the capital city of Misrata District, Libya

Mis(u)rata may also refer to:

 Misrata District, district in northwestern Libya
 Misrata Governorate, former governorate of Libya from 1963 to 1983
 Apostolic Prefecture of Misurata, the Roman Catholic missionary jurisdiction which has its see there